Richard Sulík (born 12 January 1968) is a Slovak politician, economist and businessman. He is the leader of the political party Freedom and Solidarity and served as Deputy Prime Minister for Economy and Minister of Economy in Government of Slovakia led by Eduard Heger. Sulik and his party resigned from the government on August, 31 and early September.

Life 
Born in 1968 in Czechoslovakia, Sulík emigrated in 1980 with his parents to West Germany, where they lived in the city of Pforzheim. In 1987 he went to Munich to study physics and later economics at the Ludwig Maximilian University. When the borders were reopened right after the end of the cold war, Sulík returned in 1991 to Czechoslovakia. While still a student at the University of Economics in Bratislava, he ran the company FaxCOPY.

When he graduated in 2003, Sulík was working as a special advisor of the Slovak Minister of Finance Ivan Miklos, whom he convinced to take his master thesis as a blueprint for the 2004 Slovak tax reform. This tax reform, introducing a 19% flat tax on all types of income and a 19% value added tax, was believed to be the single most important reform leading to the large increase of foreign investment in Slovakia and the economic boom period. After the reform was put through, he remained in the advisory board of the ministry.

Between 2004 and 2006, Sulìk was CEO of a municipal waste disposal company, OLO. He then returned as special advisor to the Ministry of Finance under Ján Počiatek in order to further evolve the tax system. In 2009, Sulík founded the political party Freedom and Solidarity (SaS) which he leads as Chairman. In 2010 he replaced Pavol Paška as the Speaker of Parliament.

Financial crisis 
On 14 September 2011, Richard Sulik, the Chair (Speaker) of the National Council and chair of his party, which is member of the European Conservatives and Reformists, the third largest political party of the European Parliament, announced that he would not vote for an increase of the funds for the European Financial Stability Facility, believing that allowing Greece to go bankrupt would be a better solution for the rest of the Eurozone member countries.

On 11 October 2011, his party did not vote for the European Financial Stability Facility enlargement even though Prime Minister Iveta Radičová tied the vote with a confidence vote for the government, thus toppling the Slovak government.

Refugee crisis
A former migrant himself, Sulík has strongly opposed the acceptance of subsidiarily protected migrants from the Middle East, and has expressed anti-Islamic views, stating that "I don't want to live in a Europe where more Muslims are born than Christians".

Anti-Corruption Government 
After the 2020 Slovak parliamentary election, in which SaS received 6% of the vote the party was invited by the Designated Prime Minister Igor Matovič, chair of the OĽaNO party, which won the election with 25%, to negotiations about the new Anti-Corruption Government. Sulík was promised the Ministry of Economy personally and his party was to receive the Ministry of Education as well along with the Ministry of Foreign and European Affairs. To make sure no one was bullied within the new Coalition a Coalition Council, where weekly meetings of leaders of Coalition parties would take place. Soon the new Anti-Corruption Government was plagued by new scandals. It was revealed the Prime Minister at the time Igor Matovič faked his graduation thesis and so did the new Speaker and leader of Coalition party Sme rodina. They both were dared to resign, neither did, with Matovič saying he will resign once he has accomplished what he had promised to his voters before the election.

Tensions soon arose, the Coalition Agreement signed by the four parties was frequently ignored, especially by Matovič, who blamed the SaS for any and all problems mostly via posts on Facebook and other social media. Igor Matovič's government took power during the outbreak of the COVID-19 pandemic, and his government introduced various measures such as mandatory state quarantine after returning to Slovakia from other countries, closure of establishments that are not essential and at risk of spreading the disease, ban traveling from the district of permanent residence for reasons other than work and life-necessary reasons during the Easter holidays. The ban on traveling out of the district of permanent residence without a legitimate reason was implemented by police checks at the borders of individual districts, the first day of validity this regulation caused hour-long traffic jams on busy sections, and the regulation was changed to spot checks. This measure and the closure of all non-essential operations was the subject of another dispute with Sulík, these measures were also strongly criticized by the Opposition. The problem Sulík had with this measure was the fact small business would not be doing too well, when it received little help from the state and had to close down without regard for whether in the district in question had any covid cases at all. Later on, SaS proposed a Covid Traffic Light as a solution, which Matovič ruled as out of the question for no apparent reason. While initially these measures seemed to be effective in the end the Winter of 2020 proved such theories wrong as Slovakia had one of the worse Covid-19 crises in the world.

Due to the fact SaS tried to block many measures they deemed irrational due to the lack of regard for locals in specific districts and small business Matovič accused Sulík of having a cold heart and willing to let senior citizens die for profit. Asking him indirectly through the newspapers at a press conference, whether Sulík will be the one to go and dig the graves of the senior citizens. Prior to the Christmas of 2020 Matovič said he expects Sulík to resign as Deputy Prime Minister and Minister of Economy before Christmas because he is an idiot. His reasoning for this was that the Ministry of Economy was apparently responsible for ordering Covid-19 tests, which they failed (prior to this the government passed a resolution that mandated compulsory mass testing - all citizens in the country had to get tested within a given date).

In March 2021 Matovič wanted Slovakia to order Sputnik vaccines from Russia, while the rest of the Cabinet was opposed as well as the Coalition Council. So he circumvented the Cabinet, the President and the Coalition and suddenly appeared along with his Minister of Health Marek Krajčí at Košice Airport to welcome 200 000 Sputnik vaccines out of 2 000 000 ordered along with a press conference. This sparked a coalition crisis, during which all Ministers for Za ľudí resigned, some Ministers for Sme rodina resigned and all SaS Ministers resigned with SaS announcing that Matovič must resign along with his Minister of Health. After a lengthy crisis, during which Matovič claimed he had done nothing wrong he resigned with a martyr-like speech and swapped places with his Finance Minister Eduard Heger.

After swapping places Eduard Heger became Prime Minister and Igor Matovič, his party boss, became the Minister of Finances and Deputy Prime Minister. Sulík was reappointed as Deputy Prime Minister and Minister of Economy in Heger's Cabinet. Soon however problems resurfaced. Matovič continued and in many ways doubled down on his insults directed at SaS and the party chair. It did not help that Matovič wasted, according to SaS, government funds on a vaccination lottery which was supposed to increase interest in gettin vaccinated. According to most pollsters it did not and the public viewed this measure as wasting public finances. During a vote (in early 2022) on whether the parliamentary immunity of the former triple Prime Minister Robert Fico of Smer-SD should be lifted, a vote attended by all 150 members of parliament, Matovič accused SaS of conspiring with Sme rodina to abstain during the vote (the accusation came after the vote), despite every member of parliament for SaS voting in favor, while Sme rodina abstained. Sulík called the failure of the vote the "...greatest defeat in the political career of Igor Matovič"  Around the same time there were rumors about Matovič only shooting insults at SaS because he was doing horribly in polls. Back in September 2021 the Coalition party Za ľudí fell apart and many defected to SaS, including the Minister of Justice for Za ľudí. This was a gross violation of the Coalition Agreement, but Sulík insisted that the Minister of Justice Kolíková remains as the Minister of Justice.

In June, reacting to the inflation and financial crisis Matovič proposed a 1.2 billion costly measure, which was criticized by SaS, the President and many economists. SaS threatened to veto this measure on the Coalition Council, but Matovič said that remaining in a government, which refused to help the people would be pointless. As such SaS agreed to not veto the resolution, but simply to abstain. SaS also said they would vote for it if it was amended with their proposed amendments. The entire bill was to pass in shortened legislative procedure, which means the bill could pass within a week. SaS saw this as a misuse of the shortened legislative procedure. Matovič refused to accept the SaS amendments and instead negotiated with the neo-nazi party ĽSNS to support the bill. He accepted the amendments of the ĽSNS and the bill passed. After this Matovič claimed ĽSNS were no fascists, despite calling them fascists his entire career. The President vetoed the bill and Matovič again broke the veto with the help of ĽSNS. After this the President put the bill to the Constitutional Court to determine its constitutionality. SaS accused Matovič of working with the fascists and in turn Matovič accused SaS with working with fascists as Republika, another neo-nazi group in parliament, voted against the bill.

After further attacks on the person of Richard Sulík and the SaS party as whole in early July the party gave Matovič another ultimatum. He either resigns because according to them he is "raping the legislative procedures" and "with every minute Matovič is in the Government Fico is closer to its door." Or SaS leaves the Coalition, leaving the Government in a minority. During the two months of Summer only a few meetings happened in the government hotel Bôrik in Bratislava, but Matovič never even talked about his resignation. He then proceeded to go on holiday in Spain. The ultimatum was to last until 31 August. Precisely on that date Matovič said he would resign if Sulík resigned too and if first SaS accepted 10 demands from OĽaNO, demands specifically picked to oppose the SaS electoral manifesto. SaS responded by saying they are willing to negotiate, but Matovič must first resign and Sulík will do that same in good faith. Sulík submitted his resignation to the President on the same day, but asked his other Ministers to wait until 6 September to give Matovič the time to think about it. Due to no further updates SaS Ministers left the Government on 6 September 2022 and SaS went into Opposition.

See also 
 Politics of Slovakia

References

External links 
  Richard Sulík's homepage
  Richard Sulík's blog

1968 births
Freedom and Solidarity MEPs
Freedom and Solidarity politicians
Living people
MEPs for Slovakia 2014–2019
Speakers of the National Council (Slovakia)
University of Economics in Bratislava alumni
Members of the National Council (Slovakia) 2010-2012
Members of the National Council (Slovakia) 2020-present
Members of the National Council (Slovakia) 2012-2016